Akande Tope (born 3 December 1997) is a Nigeria footballer who currently playing for Sunshine Stars. He has played for Shooting Stars in the Nigeria Premier League. He is from a family of 4 professional football players Akande Niyi Busaga, Akande Tunde plying his trade in Ethiopia Super League and Akande Abiodun Asimiyu the Nigeria youth international. He was signed on loan from Karamone F.C. in 2012 to Prime F.C. in the NIgeria Federation FA Cup and Nigeria National League NNL. He burst into the lime-lights in 2012 when he started showing more than expectations of the technical crew of Prime FC that made them fix him regular to the team. He was part of the team that made Prime FC qualified for the Semi-Final of the Nigeria Football Federation FA Cup which he scored a fantastic volley goal. He becameone of the key player of Prime FC in 2012 till 2014 but during his playing in Prime FC, several Nigeria top premier league teams Warri Wolves, Enyimba International F.C., Shooting Stars F.C. and Enugu Rangers F.C. made transfer request which negotiation could not finalised. Tope's representative is Ramone Remmie

References

 Akande Tope sign for Shooting Stars F.C. - Nigeria Premier League season 2015

External links
Akande Tope assist goal for Prime FC in FA Cup Games - MTN Football
Akande Tope scores and impacted in Prime FC brilliance - Nigeria Federation Cup
Akande Brothers- Soccer Laduma
Akande Tope half volley strike - youtube

1997 births
Living people
Nigerian footballers
Osun United F.C. players
Karamone F.C. players
Nigeria Professional Football League players
Place of birth missing (living people)
Yoruba sportspeople
Association football defenders
Footballers from Enugu